Jozsef Wolfner (Arad, June 5, 1856; Budapest, February 16, 1932) was a Hungarian publisher, founder of the publishing house Singer and Wolfner.

"He was a bourgeois, and in Hungary there are bourgeois, proletarians and Bohemians, but the real bourgeois is not common. Wolfner was a real bourgeois whose lifestyle was the dignity and enthusiasm for his job. He perfectly adhered to Baudelaire’s expression that stated: "You have to work, because work is less boring than fun." Well, Wolfner was a man who was never bored. His life was dedicated to design and creativity".
- From Ferenc Herceg’s memorial speech

Life

We know very little about Jozsef Wolfner’s life. In 1885, after completing his university studies, he founded along with Sandor Singer the publishing house Singer and Wolfner which was mainly devoted to literary works for children. In 1923 Wolfner transformed the publishing house into a joint stock company assuming the role of President and Director. Singer and Wolfner became soon well known for its works on economic issues and for the publication of significant journals and books. The library was located in Budapest, at 16 Andrassy Street. The publisher’s office was on the top floor of the same building.

Editorial politics

At the beginning of the twentieth century Jozsef Wolfner was a successful businessman and well known and respected as an erudite man of letters. The formula to his success was his ability to quickly perceive the needs of readers. Among the authors published by Singer and Wolfner were Ferenc Herczeg, Géza Gárdonyi, Kalman Csátó, Miklos Suranyi, along with Beniczky Bajza Lenke and Hedwig Courths-Mahler.

Wolfner's attention was mainly directed to the taste of the local middle class and the intellectual bourgeois. This literature was suitable for young adults since the books were simple, easy to read and in paperback formats. The most successful works were those by Lajos Posa and Zsigmond Sebok.

The publishing house became also famous for its founder's passion for art collecting and patronage. The latter's son, István Farkas, a famous and recognized painter, followed the path of his father by becoming an art collector and patron as well. He collaborated with Jenő Barcsay, Gyula Hincz, Lajos Szalay and Tibor Vilt. Farkas was also the publishing house Director from 1932 to 1944 when Singer and Wolfner assumed the name of Literary Institute of Modern Times.

Publications

1885: Series of novels for adults (1885 -1931). Until 1917, published more than 500 volumes.
1889: My newspaper - magazine for children. Editor Lajos Posa.
1889: Economic Library - collection of notebooks for boys (350 volumes).
1895: Modern Times - illustrated weekly magazine of art and classical literature for readers of the middle-class conservative. Editor: Ferenc Herczeg. The employees were writers Sandor Brody and Gardonyi Geza Kalman and Mikszath. After 1945 the editor was the poet Jozsef Fodor that, for the first two numbers, collaborated with Lajos Kassak. The magazine was published until 1949.
The encicopledia of modern times - in version 12 and 24 volumes.
1895: Hungarian Girls - magazine for teenage girls. Editor Anna Tutsek.
1902: Art Magazine.
1911 Weekly magazine Hungarian Observatory.
1915: Book of Millions.
1930: The Art Hongrois. Art publishing Franco-Hungarian about major Hungarian painters. Editor Francois Gachot. Edited volumes: József Rippl-Rónai, Tivadar Kosztka Csontváry, István Nagy, Gyula Derkovits, Jozsef Egry.

Special editions

Lajos Bíró
Sándor Bródy
 Imre Farkas
 Pal Farkas
 Geza Gardonyi
 Ferenc Herczeg: all the works - 1926 special edition of commemoration.
 Gyula Krúdy
 Karoly Lovik
 Gyorgy Lorinc
 Lajos Posa
 Mihaly Szabolcska
 Istvan Szomahazy
 Bela Toth:Anecdotes in six volumes.
 Ferenc Gaspar: Around the earth. Prestigious geographical works.

See also

Singer and Wolfner
István Farkas
Ferenc Herczeg
Alessandra Farkas

References

Further reading

 Révai Nagylexikon
 Fábri Anna: Írók, költők, törzshelyek. In: Budapesti Negyed 1993/1.
 Fülöp Géza: A magyar könyvkultúra története 1945-ig. In: Könyvkiadók és könyvterjesztők Magyarországon. Budapest. 1987.
 Galli Katalin: A könyv története II. 1550-től a 20. század közepéig. Budapest: Hatágú Síp Alapítvány. 2005.
 Kókay György: A könyvkereskedelem Magyarországon. Budapest: Balassi Kiadó. 117.o.
 Jozsef Wolfner (8 genn.1856 -16 febb. 1932).(Edizione commemorativa) Singer e Wolfner 1932 – Discorso commemorativo di Ferenc Herczeg.
 Alessandra Farkas: Pranzo di Famiglia, Sperling&Kupfer Editori, 2006 .
 Elhunyt Wolfner József.
 Magyar Zsido Lexicon

External links 

Magyar életrajzi lexikon http://mek.oszk.hu/00300/00355/html/ABC16920/17141.htm
Elek Artúr: Elhunyt Wolfner József = Nyugat 1932/5. http://www.epa.oszk.hu/00000/00022/00532/16615.htm
Mostra su István Farkas all'Accademia d'Ungheria a Roma.
Al Vittoriano a Roma le opere del pittore ungherese István Farkas Adnkronos 14 settembre 2002.
La storia della famiglia Farkas. Il talento e la cultura di una famiglia ungherese Adnkronos - 22 luglio 2006
Pranzo di famiglia di Alessandra Farkas Mosaico - CEM - 17 Aprile 2006

1856 births
1932 deaths
People from Arad, Romania
Romanian Jews
Austro-Hungarian Jews
Hungarian publishers (people)